JS Awaji (MSO-304) is the lead ship of the Awaji-class minesweeper of Japan Maritime Self-Defense Force (JMSDF).

Construction and career 
Awaji was laid down on 27 February 2014 and launched on 27 October 2015 by Japan Marine United Yokohama Shipyard. She was commissioned on 16 March 2017 and was incorporated It was incorporated into the 1st Mine Warfare Group and deployed to Yokosuka.

From July 18 to July 30 of the same year, participated in mine warfare training and minesweeping special training in Mutsu Bay.

From July 18 to July 30, 2018, she conducted a mine warfare training and a Japan-US-India joint minesweeping special training in Mutsu Bay.

Gallery

Citations

References 

 Chapter 6 Third Defense Era, 25 Years of the Maritime Self-Defense Force, Maritime Staff Office, 1980.
 Hiroshi Nagata, What is required of future self-defense ships (new type of Maritime Self-Defense Force), Ships of the World, No. 550, Gaijinsha, April 1999, pp. 69–73

Ships built by Japan Marine United
2015 ships
Awaji-class minesweepers